Robert, Rob, Bob, or Bobby Dixon may refer to:

Bob Dixon
 Bob Dixon (athlete) (1907–1941), Canadian athlete
 Bob Dixon (footballer) (1904–1980), English footballer for West Ham United and Stoke
 Bob Dixon (Missouri politician) (b. 1969), of the Missouri State Senate, formerly served in the Missouri House of Representatives
 Bobby Dixon (born 1983), American basketball player
 Bobby Digital (Jamaican producer) (Bobby Dixon), reggae and dancehall producer

Robert Dixon
 Robert Dixon (1780–1815), English landscape artist
 Robert Dixon (clergyman) (1614-1688), English clergyman
 Robert Dixon (explorer) (1800–1858), Australian explorer
 Robert Dixon (Irish politician) (1685–1732) Irish  MP  and judge
 Robert Dixon (mathematician) (born 1947), British mathematician and graphic artist
 Robert E. Dixon (1906–1981), U.S. Navy admiral and aviator
 Robert J. Dixon (1920–2003), United States Air Force general
 Robert K. Dixon, energy, environment, and economic expert at the US Department of Energy
 Robert M. W. Dixon (born 1939), Australian linguist
 Robert Vickers Dixon (1812–1885), Irish academic and clergyman
 Robert Dixon (character), fictional character in Australian TV series Sea Patrol

Rob Dixon
 Rob Dixon, American jazz saxophonist
 Rob Dixon (strength athlete) (born 1964), British strongman competitor

See also
 Robert Dixon-Smith, Baron Dixon-Smith (born 1934), British peer and Conservative politician
 Robert Dickson (disambiguation)